Robert B. Hauser, A.S.C., (March 25, 1919, Spokane, Washington – July 8, 1994, Los Angeles, California) was an American cinematographer that worked on more than 70 television and film projects from 1958 to his death in 1994, at age 75.

Biography

Film and Television
For a period of 10 years from 1958 to 1968 he worked mainly in television as director of photography. From 1958 to 1959 he worked on 12 episodes of Man with a Camera that starred Charles Bronson. In 1960 he did 4 episodes of The Untouchables. Others he worked on were Combat!, Breaking Point, Peyton Place,  The Man from U.N.C.L.E., Mission: Impossible and Trapper John, M.D.. From 1968 to 1981 he worked on many films including The Odd Couple, Riot, Mean Dog Blues and Killjoy.

Nominations
He was nominated twice for Primetime Emmy awards. Once in 1963 for TV series Combat and again in 1978 for Roll of Thunder, Hear My Cry''.

References

1919 births
1994 deaths
People from Spokane, Washington
American cinematographers